Patino is a rural locality (a village) in Nelazskoye Rural Settlement, Cherepovetsky District, Vologda Oblast, Russia. The population was 43 as of 2002.

Geography 
Nelazskoye is the nearest rural locality.

References 

Rural localities in Cherepovetsky District